Aaron Fink may refer to:

 Aaron Fink (musician), former guitarist of Breaking Benjamin
 Aaron Fink (artist) (born 1955), American artist